The 2022 Winter Paralympics, commonly known as Beijing 2022, was an international winter multi-sport parasports event held in  Beijing, China from 4 to 13 March 2022. This was the 13th Winter Paralympic Games, as administered by the International Paralympic Committee (IPC).

Beijing was selected as the host city for the 2022 Winter Olympics and Paralympics in 2015 at the 128th IOC Session in Kuala Lumpur, Malaysia; taking into account its hosting of the 2008 Summer Paralympics, Beijing is the first city to have hosted both the Summer and Winter Olympics as well as the Summer and Winter Paralympics. This was the overall second Paralympics in China. It was the last of three consecutive Paralympics hosted in East Asia.

These Games featured 564 athletes representing 46 National Paralympic Committees (NPCs), competing in 78 medal events across six sports. Participation in the Games was impacted by the ongoing Russian invasion of Ukraine; the International Olympic Committee (IOC) condemned Russia for violating the Olympic Truce, and called for both Russia and its supporter Belarus to be excluded from international sporting events. While the IPC initially announced that the countries' athletes would be allowed to compete independently under the Paralympic flag, it backtracked on 3 March 2022 – the eve of the opening ceremonies – following threats of a boycott by multiple NPCs, and announced that Belarusian and Russian athletes would be prohibited from competing. The Belarusian and Russian delegations competed at a replacement event from 17 to 21 March in Khanty-Mansiysk, Russia. Armenia, Kazakhstan and Tajikistan also competed at the replacement event.

Host nation China finished at the top of the medal table, winning a total of 61 medals, of which 18 were gold, setting a new record as the most successful Asian country at a single Winter Paralympics with the most total medals, gold, silver, and bronze. Ukraine also made their best historical performance and finished in second place with 29 medals, of which 11 were gold, and Canada retained the third place achieved in 2010, 2014 and 2018 with a total of 25 medals, of which eight were gold again.

Host selection 

As part of a formal agreement between the International Paralympic Committee and the International Olympic Committee first established in 2001, the winner of the bid for the 2022 Winter Olympics was also to host the 2022 Winter Paralympics.

Beijing was selected as the host city of the 2022 Winter Olympics after beating Almaty by four votes on 31 July 2015 at the 128th IOC Session in Kuala Lumpur, Malaysia.

Opening ceremony

The opening ceremony was held on 4 March 2022 at the Beijing National Stadium; it was directed by Zhang Yimou, with the theme "Blossoming of Life".

During his opening remarks, IPC president Andrew Parsons condemned the Russian invasion of Ukraine and the circumvention of the Olympic Truce by Russia, emphasising that Paralympic athletes compete with, and not "against", each other, and that "the 21st century is a time for dialogue and diplomacy, not war and hate". The final torchbearer was four-time Chinese para-athletics gold medalist Li Duan, who mounted the torch at the centre of a large snowflake sculpture.

Closing ceremony

The closing ceremony was held on 13 March 2022. The ceremony closed after nine days of competition and 78 events at the Beijing National Stadium in Beijing, China.

Sports 
Seventy-eight events in five sports were held during the 2022 Winter Paralympics, two lower than 2018. In June 2019, the IPC dropped four of the six proposed disciplines for women's snowboarding (leaving only LL2 banked slalom and snowboard cross), as they did not meet the required viability benchmarks during the 2019 World Para Snowboard Championships.

 
Nordic skiing

Venues

Beijing cluster 
Olympic Green venues
 Beijing National Aquatics Center – curling
 Beijing National Indoor Stadium – para ice hockey
 Beijing National Stadium – opening and closing ceremonies
 Beijing Paralympic Village
 China National Convention Center – MPC/IBC

Yanqing District cluster 
 Xiaohaituo Alpine Skiing Field – alpine skiing
 Yanqing MMC: Media Center
 Yanqing Paralympic Village and Medal Plaza

Zhangjiakou cluster 
 Kuyangshu Biathlon Field – cross-country skiing and biathlon 
 Genting Resort – Snowboarding
 Zhangjiakou Paralympic Village and Medal Plaza

Participating National Paralympics Committees 
In total, 46 National Paralympic Committees have qualified athletes. Azerbaijan, Israel and Puerto Rico made their Winter Paralympic debut, while Liechtenstein, Estonia, and Latvia returned for the first time since Lillehammer 1994, Salt Lake 2002, and Turin 2006, respectively. Seven National Paralympic Committees that participated in PyeongChang 2018 did not send their delegations to Beijing: Armenia, Bulgaria, North Korea, Serbia, Tajikistan, Turkey and Uzbekistan. Additionally, Russia and Belarus were barred from entering. A new record of 138 female athletes were scheduled to compete, which was five more than the 133 female athletes in 2018.

On 24 February 2022, the first day of the Russian invasion of Ukraine, the International Olympic Committee condemned the breach of the Olympic Truce (which lasts from the beginning of the Olympics through the end of the Paralympics) by Russia. President of the IPC Andrew Parsons stated that getting the Ukrainian team to Beijing would be a "mammoth challenge". The IOC called for the flags of both Russia and Belarus not to be displayed at any international sporting event, the latter due to the country's support of Russia's aggression, and officials of the Belarus Olympic Committee having been accused of political discrimination against Belarusian athletes. The Russian flag has already been prohibited from international sporting events through December 2021 due to sanctions by the World Anti-Doping Agency (WADA), and its athletes would have originally participated under the name "RPC" (Russian Paralympic Committee).

On 28 February 2022, the IOC Executive Board further called for Russian and Belarusian athletes not to be allowed to participate in any international sporting event. On 2 March 2022, the IPC declared that Russian and Belarusian athletes would be allowed to participate independently under the Paralympic flag, with their results not counting in the medal standings. As a result of criticism by several National Paralympic Committees, who threatened to boycott the Games, the IPC announced on 3 March 2022 that they would reverse their earlier decision, banning Russian and Belarusian athletes from competing at the 2022 Winter Paralympics. In response, Vladimir Putin's press secretary Dmitry Peskov condemned the IPC for the decision. In response, Russia hosted a replacement event named "We are together, Sport" that was attended by Russia, Belarus, Kazakhstan, Tajikistan, and Armenia.

Azerbaijan was scheduled to make its debut, but its only athlete was seriously injured at the last training session on the eve of the start and did not compete in his event. However, the country participated in the Parade of Nations in both the opening and closing ceremonies.

Number of athletes by National Paralympic Committee
564 athletes from 46 NPCs:

Calendar

Medal summary

Podium sweeps 

During the medals ceremony, the Ukrainians' men's 6 kilometres vision impaired biathlon silver and bronze medal teams were mistakenly placed in each other's podium positions.

Branding

Emblem
The emblem for the 2022 Winter Paralympics, "Flying High" (""), was unveiled alongside its Olympic counterpart on 15 December 2017 at the Beijing National Aquatics Center. Designed by Lin Cunzhen, it is a multi-coloured ribbon resembling the Chinese character for "fly" (飞"), and is designed to symbolize "an athlete in a wheelchair rushing towards the finish line and victory". They are the first Paralympics to use an updated version of the "agitos" emblem in an official capacity.

Mascot

The mascot "Shuey Rhon Rhon" was unveiled on 17 September 2019 at the Shougang Ice Hockey Arena and was designed by Jiang Yufan. The mascot is designed with lanterns as the prototype. Lanterns represent harvest, celebration, warmth and light. The wishful shape at the top symbolizes auspicious happiness; the continuous pattern of the dove of peace and the Temple of Heaven symbolizes the peaceful friendship and highlights the characteristics of the place where the place is held; the decorative pattern incorporates the traditional Chinese paper-cut art; the snow on the face represents the meaning of "a fall of seasonable snow gives promise of a fruitful year" 
(). It also reflects the anthropomorphic design and highlights the mascot's cuteness.

See also

Olympic and Paralympic Games hosted in China:
2008 Summer Olympics
2008 Summer Paralympics
2022 Winter Olympics

Notes

References

External links 
 Official website

 
Winter Paralympics
Winter Paralympic Games
Sports competitions in Beijing
Winter Paralympics
Paralympics
Sport in Zhangjiakou
Multi-sport events in China
2020s in Beijing
Winter Paralympics
Sports events affected by the 2022 Russian invasion of Ukraine
2022 in disability sport